The Purdue Fort Wayne Mastodons men's basketball team is the intercollegiate men's basketball team that represents Purdue University Fort Wayne (PFW). They have been a member of the Horizon League since 2020 (departing from the Summit League after thirteen years). Formerly, they represented the now defunct Indiana University – Purdue University Fort Wayne (IPFW). The team has yet to participate in the NCAA Division I men's basketball tournament. The Mastodons are coached by Jon Coffman and play their home games at the Hilliard Gates Sports Center and the Allen County War Memorial Coliseum in Fort Wayne, Indiana.

History
The Mastodons' first season was 1973–74. Two-time All-American and conference player of the year Sean Gibson (1993) is the current all-time leading rebounder and Hall of Fame member.  In 2013, Frank Gaines passed Gibson to be the Mastodons all-time leading scorer. Their first season in Division I was 2001–02. In 2007, the Mastadons joined the Summit League. Before joining NCAA Division I athletics, IPFW competed in NCAA Division II's Great Lakes Valley Conference.

In 2014, IPFW reach their first Summit League tournament championship before losing to North Dakota State.

Beginning in 2016, the school rebranded itself from IPFW to Fort Wayne to build a stronger tie to the Fort Wayne community. The transition only affected the athletic department's branding efforts. The university's IPFW academic brand remained unchanged.

On November 22, 2016, the Mastodons defeated the then No. 3-ranked Indiana Hoosiers 71–68 in overtime in front of 11,076 in attendance at Allen County War Memorial Coliseum. This defeat of Indiana was the Mastodons first victory over an AP Top 25 ranked team in program history.

Conference affiliation

Postseason

NCAA Division II Tournament results
The Mastodons have appeared in one NCAA Division II tournament. Their record is 0–2.

NIT results
The Mastodons have appeared in one National Invitation Tournament (NIT). Their record is 0–1.

CBI results
The Mastodons have appeared in one College Basketball Invitational (CBI). Their combined record is 0–1.

CIT results
The Mastodons have appeared in four CollegeInsider.com Postseason Tournaments (CIT). Their combined record is 2–4.

Division I season records

Source

References

External links
 

 
1973 establishments in Indiana
Basketball teams established in 1973